Stoney Point is a neighborhood within the city limits of Tampa, Florida. As of the 2000 census the neighborhood had a population of 130. The ZIP code serving the area is 33629.

Geography
Stoney Point is surrounded by Tampa Bay on three sides and Sunset Park on the east. The neighborhood is part of the South Tampa district.

Demographics
Source: Hillsborough County Atlas

At the 2000 census there were 130 people and 50 households residing in the neighborhood. The population density was 4,585/mi2.  The racial makeup of the neighborhood was 99% White, 0% African American, 0% Native American, 0% Asian, 0% from other races, and none were from two or more races. Hispanic or Latino of any race were about 7%.

Of the 50 households 38% had children under the age of 18 living with them, 74% were married couples living together, 6% had a female householder with no husband present, and none were non-families. 20% of households were made up of individuals.

The age distribution was 27% under the age of 18, 10% from 18 to 34, 27% from 35 to 49, 24% from 50 to 64, and 13% 65 or older. For every 100 females, there were 100 males.

The per capita income for the neighborhood was $75,999. About 1% of the population were below the poverty line

See also
Neighborhoods in Tampa, Florida

References

External links
Stoney Point Civic Association

Neighborhoods in Tampa, Florida